Ludwig Schraut (born 9 September 1935) is a Swiss retired footballer who played for FC Basel as a forward.

Schraut joined FC Basel's first team for their 1959–60 season under manager Jenő Vincze. After two test games, Schraut played his domestic league debut for the club in the home game at the Landhof on 30 August 1959 as Basel lost 0–2 against Biel-Bienne.

During his one season with the club, Schraut played a total of 12 games for Basel scoring one goal. Eight of these games were in the Nationalliga A, one in the Swiss Cup and three were friendly games. He scored his only goal in the test game on 8 August 1959 as Basel won 6–1 against local team SC Kleinhüningen.

References

Sources
 Die ersten 125 Jahre. Publisher: Josef Zindel im Friedrich Reinhardt Verlag, Basel. 
 Verein "Basler Fussballarchiv" Homepage

FC Basel players
Swiss men's footballers
Association football forwards
1935 births
Living people